Udhampur Lok Sabha constituency is one of the six Lok Sabha (parliamentary) constituencies in Jammu and Kashmir in northern India. The constituency covers 20,230 square kilometres of mountainous Himalayan terrain, and is comparable to the size of Israel. It is composed of the districts of Kishtwar, Ramban, Kathua, Doda, Reasi, and Udhampur. Udhampur constituency's population is over 2,400,000, and exceeds the population of New Mexico. The seat from 1967-1980 was held by Karan Singh, the former crown prince of Jammu and Kashmir.

Previous Assembly segments
Udhampur Lok Sabha constituency is composed of the following assembly segments:
 Kishtwar (assembly constituency no. 51)
 Inderwal (assembly constituency no. 52)
 Doda (assembly constituency no. 53)
 Bhadarwah (assembly constituency no. 54)
 Ramban (SC) (assembly constituency no. 55)
 Banihal (assembly constituency no. 56)
 Gulabgarh (assembly constituency no. 57)
 Reasi (assembly constituency no. 58)
 Gool Arnas (assembly constituency no. 59)
 Udhampur (assembly constituency no. 60)
 Chenani (SC) (assembly constituency no. 61)
 Ramnagar (assembly constituency no. 62)
 Bani (assembly constituency no. 63)
 Basohli (assembly constituency no. 64)
 Kathua (assembly constituency no. 65)
 Billawar (assembly constituency no. 66)
 Hiranagar (SC) (assembly constituency no. 67)

New Assembly segments

Members of Parliament

^ by poll

Election Results

2019 result

2014 result

2004 result

See also
 Doda district
 Kathua district
 Kishtwar district
 Ramban district
 Reasi district
 Udhampur district
 List of Constituencies of the Lok Sabha

References

Lok Sabha constituencies in Jammu and Kashmir
Udhampur district
Doda district
Kathua district
Kishtwar district
Ramban district
Reasi district
Udhampur